Phil Ponce (born September 26, 1949) is an American journalist and television presenter. Ponce is notable as a Chicago television journalist who hosts Chicago Tonight: Latino Voices, a weekly television magazine of news and culture in Chicago's predominantly Latino communities. It airs on weekends, along with Chicago Tonight and Chicago Tonight: Black Voices, on WTTW 11.

Early life
Ponce was born on 1949 in McAllen, Texas, but was raised in East Chicago, Indiana. He graduated from Bishop Noll Institute in Hammond, Indiana. He then attended  Indiana University and received a B.A. in English in 1971. In 1974 he received a J.D. from the University of Michigan.

Ponce's parents both were steelworkers.  During college, Ponce worked as a steelworker during summers.

Career
Ponce began his career as a lawyer.  He practiced law for six years before going into broadcasting.

Ponce got his first job in broadcasting as a weekend reporter for an ABC affiliate in Indianapolis.

In 1982 he joined the Chicago CBS station WBBM-TV as a reporter.  Ponce left WBBM-TV in late 1991 to take a position as manager of international communications for the telecommunications company Ameritech Corporation.

In 1992, Ponce began his career at WTTW11 as a correspondent for Chicago Tonight — a position he held until 1997 when he left to become one of Jim Lehrer's supporting anchors on the national PBS show, The News Hour with Jim Lehrer. He returned to Chicago two years later as the successor to long-time Chicago Tonight host, John Callaway  (Callaway later hosted WTTW's Friday Night program). Ponce also teaches journalism at Loyola University Chicago where he is the university's distinguished journalist in residence.

He has received numerous awards for his work.  In 2007, he was an honorary inductee into Alpha Sigma Nu, the Jesuit honor society. Other awards include Illinois Journalist of the Year, the Studs Terkel Award and the IU Latino Alumni Award.

In late 2017, Ponce announced that he would reduce his workload to three days a week during 2018 and two days a week in 2019.

Personal life
Ponce's wife, Ann Ponce, is a Chicago portrait and landscape artist.

Ponce's daughter, Maria Ponce, is a photographer in Chicago. Ponce also has two sons. Dan Ponce is the founder of the a cappella group, Straight No Chaser, and was a television reporter with ABC7 (WLS-TV) in Chicago for three years until leaving in January 2009. Dan is currently a morning anchor at WGN Ch. 9. His other son, Anthony Ponce, was a television reporter with NBC5 (WMAQ-TV), and is now a morning anchor at WFLD Ch. 32, also in Chicago. All have degrees from Indiana University and Ponce's sons also have graduate degrees from  Northwestern University's Medill School of Journalism.

Ponce lives in Ravenswood, Chicago.

References

External links

1949 births
Living people
Television anchors from Chicago
Television anchors from Indianapolis
Indiana University alumni
People from McAllen, Texas
University of Michigan Law School alumni
Loyola University Chicago faculty